The discography of American alternative rock band Mazzy Star consists of four studio albums, two EPs, twelve singles and eight music videos. The band was formed in 1989 by vocalist Hope Sandoval and guitarist David Roback, after the disbandment of Roback's previous band with vocalist Kendra Smith, Opal. Mazzy Star's debut studio album, She Hangs Brightly, was released by Rough Trade Records in 1990, and eventually spawned two singles: "Blue Flower" in 1990 and "Halah" in 1995.

So Tonight That I Might See was issued through Capitol Records in 1993. Lead single "Five String Serenade" was followed by "Fade into You", which remains their biggest hit to date, and their only single to enter the Billboard Hot 100. The song also charted in Australia, Canada and the UK. The album was certified platinum by the RIAA for shipments of over a million units, and was certified silver by the British Phonographic Industry for sales in excess of 60,000 copies in the United Kingdom. "She's My Baby" was released as a promotional single. Although never officially released, "Into Dust" appeared on several national record charts after it featured in various advertising campaigns: first by Virgin Media in 2009, and later on the "Dust to Dust" trailer for Gears of War 3 (2011). 

Their third studio album, Among My Swan, was released by Capitol in 1996. "Flowers in December" was issued as its only official single, followed by the double A-sided promotional release "I've Been Let Down" and "Roseblood". After a fifteen year absence, the band released the double A-sided single "Common Burn" / "Lay Myself Down" in 2011. This was followed by their fourth studio album, Seasons of Your Day, in 2013, which reached a career-high peak of No. 24 on the UK Albums Chart. In 2014, non-album single "I'm Less Here" was issued as part of Record Store Day. Their most recent release is the 2018 EP Still.

Studio albums

EPs

EPs

Singles

Promotional singles

Other charted songs

Music videos

Notes

References

Discographies of American artists
Rock music group discographies